Todd Lakes is a lake in the Moira River and Lake Ontario drainage basins in Addington Highlands, Lennox and Addington County, Ontario, Canada.

The primary inflow, at the north, and the primary outflow,  at south towards Merrill Lake, is Merrill Creek. Its waters flow via Partridge Creek, the Skootamatta River and the Moira River into the Bay of Quinte on Lake Ontario at Belleville.

See also
List of lakes in Ontario

References

Lakes of Lennox and Addington County